Brim Fuentes, is the founding member of graffiti crew TATS CRU, and was born in the South Bronx, New York City. Brim was fortunate enough to start writing graffiti in one of the most important periods of graffiti history. He began bombing and hitting New York City Subway trains, in the late 1970s, all the way through to the mid-1980s. After the trains were cleaned in 1989 he and the rest of TATS CRU took to the streets and began bombing and creating street art all over the city.

Brim's friendship to Afrika Bambaataa, and the almighty Universal Zulu Nation led to Brim being featured in one of the most important videos in hip-hop culture, "Afrika Bambaataa - Renegades of Funk",

Brim was also featured in many other important documentaries and movies about Hip-Hop and graffiti culture from that time period including Dick Fontaine's 1987 documentary "Bombin" where he was introduced to fellow British graffiti artists Goldie  and 3D  (who later went on to form Massive Attack) .  Brim became Goldie's artistic mentor, New York was the place that lifted his horizons, and America was where he would later become "Goldie".

Brim was documented as the first graffiti artist to come to the UK and appeared on many TV stations and newspapers including the front page of The Daily Telegraph discussing this graffiti culture. Upon this media frenzy Brim was invited to lecture at Oxford University and was asked personally by Michael Winner to create the backdrops in his film Death Wish 3 which starred Charles Bronson.

The prequel to this film was BBC'S 1984 Beat This: A Hip-Hop History The film included footage from DJ Kool Herc's original parties, The Cold Crush Brothers, Jazzy Jay, Soul Sonic Force and Afrika Bambaataa. The film featured Brim's take on graffiti in New York. The film was one of the first documentaries about Hip-Hop.

Brim would go on to form a clothing line FJ560 with then famous rapper and friend Fat Joe The flagship store was located in the Bronx, New York City. Fat Joe, The Terror Squad and Big Pun can be seen in many videos wearing FJ560. Fat Joe would paint with TATS CRU before he was a famous rapper.

Brim and TATS CRU would be heavily involved with advertisement for Fat Joe and created painted billboards across the city promoting his album releases. By becoming such an iconic figure in the world of art he received a mention alongside other TATS CRU members in the KRS-One track "Out For Fame". On the passing of Big Pun, TATS CRU painted the memorial wall that is visited daily; Brim is currently working on the Big Pun statue project that will create a 3D memorial wall in honor of the late Big Pun

Brim currently lives in China.


Artworks
 Grandmaster Flash – They Said It Couldn't Be Done 
 Grandmaster Flash - Fresh and Furious: Hip Hop's Beginning

Filmography
 All City:(1983)
Beat This: A Hip-Hop History (1984)
 Body Rock:(1984)
Graffiti Rock:(1984)
 Bombin:(1987)

References

External links 
 Tats Cru, Inc. website
 Beat This: A Hip-Hop History

American graffiti artists
People from the Bronx
Year of birth missing (living people)
Living people